Julie Simone Brill (born March 12, 1959) is an American lawyer who serves as Chief Privacy Officer and Corporate Vice President for Global Privacy and Regulatory Affairs at Microsoft. Prior to this, Brill served as a member of the Federal Trade Commission (FTC) from 2010 to 2016.

Early life and education
Brill was born in Houston, Texas on March 12, 1959. In 1977, Brill graduated from Columbia High School in Maplewood, New Jersey, and was later inducted into the school's hall of fame in 2012. Brill graduated magna cum laude with a bachelor's degree (B.A.) in economics from Princeton University. In 1985, she received her Juris Doctor (J.D.) degree from the New York University School of Law as a Root-Tilden-Kern scholar.

Government career

Assistant Vermont Attorney General 
From 1988 to 2008, Brill served in the Vermont Attorney General's office as Assistant Attorney General for Consumer Protection and Antitrust. In 1991, she and her staff discovered that 3,000 Vermont residents were identified as having tax liens against them by a consumer credit reporting agency. She also worked to coordinate with other states as co-chair of the Privacy Working Group at the National Association of Attorneys General.

Federal Trade Commission (FTC) 
In 2009, President Barack Obama nominated Brill to replace Pamela Jones Harbour as a member of the Federal Trade Commission (FTC). Brill was unanimously confirmed by the Senate on March 3, 2010, and she was officially sworn in on April 6, 2010. While at the FTC, Brill focused on the privacy implications of emerging technologies, including how personal data is gathered and used.

During her tenure on the FTC, Brill action against technology companies for failing to secure personal data properly, and supported additional protection for consumer data rights. Brill advocated for the development of a "do not track" feature to allow Internet users to tell websites to stop tracking their online activities, and created a "Reclaim Your Name" project to encourage more transparency within the data broker industry. In 2014 she appeared on CBS 60 Minutes to discuss the data broker industry and what needs to change to provide more control for consumers.

Following the resignation of Jon Leibowitz as FTC Chair, Brill was widely speculated to be his likely replacement in the position. However, the position of FTC Chair instead went to fellow Commissioner Edith Ramirez. Brill left office on March 31, 2016, and her seat was later filled in 2018 by Noah J. Phillips, a Republican.

Post-government career

Microsoft
Brill joined Microsoft in 2017. She currently serves as chief privacy officer, corporate vice president and deputy general counsel of global privacy and regulatory affairs. She is also responsible for artificial intelligence, digital security, regulatory governance and access compliance.

Personal life and recognition 
In 1989, Brill married industrial designer Mark Miller. She received the New York University School of Law Alumna of the Year Award in 2014, and was elected to the American Law Institute in 2013. In 2014 she received the Privacy Leader of the Year Award from the International Association of Privacy Professionals.

See also 
 List of former FTC commissioners

References

This article uses public domain material from the Federal Trade Commission Website.

Living people
Federal Trade Commission personnel
Princeton University alumni
American women lawyers
New York University School of Law alumni
Paul, Weiss, Rifkind, Wharton & Garrison people
Columbia High School (New Jersey) alumni
Obama administration personnel
21st-century American women
1959 births